Abhimanyu is a 1991 Indian Malayalam-language crime drama film directed by Priyadarshan and written by T. Damodaran. It stars Mohanlal, Geetha, and Shankar. The plot revolves around the Bombay (now Mumbai) underworld and the transformation of an innocent guy into a crime boss in the city. The tagline of the movie is Crime Never Pays.

The Fim Got A Certificate from Censorboard.The film was a commercial success at the box office. The film is noted for its screenplay, direction and background score. Mohanlal won the Kerala State Film Award for Best Actor. Its Tamil dubbed version Arasan was also a box office success. The movie was later dubbed and released in Hindi as Satyaghath - Crime Never Pays. It was remade in Tamil as Thalai Nagaram (2006), Telugu as Nagaram(2008) and in Kannada as Devru (2009). Art direction was by Thotta Tharani.

Plot 
Harikrishnan is an immigrant in Mumbai, who, like many thousands of immigrants, is struggling to make ends meet. He shares a room with a group of Malayali guys, who have their personal problems and difficulties. The film begins with Harikrishnan witnessing the murder of a journalist, and being asked by police to appear at an identification parade, which he does. Hari and his friends stay in a room at Kamathipura, which also houses the largest red lighted area in India. He accidentally meets Kiran, a Telugu girl in the brothel, for whom he develops feelings. In a short attempt to make money, Hari and his friends start making local hooch which is then supplied by their friend Manikandan, who is a taxi driver. One of the friends Shekhar, falls in love with Mani's sister without the knowledge of anyone else.

One fine morning, Mudaliar, a Tamil don who ruled the streets is shot dead by Abbas Ali, his own henchman who shifted his loyalty to Amar Bakia, another cold blooded don. With the death of Mudaliar, Amar Bakia becomes the undisputed don of the city, and Abbas Ali his lieutenant. Abbas, after coming to know about the small scale smuggling activities of Hari and his gang, threatens him and asks him to come and meet him on the day of Vinayak Chathurthi and pay him a large amount as fine.

In midst of the celebration, Hari enters the house of Abbas Ali and shoots him down, inviting the enmity of Amar Bakhia. Chotta Shankar, a local goon belonging to Bakhia gang, attacks Hari, but Hari beats them up mercilessly. He is soon arrested by the police and beaten up in the cell by the inspector and Bakhia in an attempt to make him confess for the murder of Abbas. Assuming that he is dead, they throw him into the street. He is discovered alive and saved by the lady owner of the brothel and she along with Kiran takes care of him. With this incident, Hari becomes the local leader and within a short span Chotta and others join his gang. Hari thus becomes Hari Anna, who also becomes a negotiator in land disputes, financial matters and local business stiffs.

Amar Bakhia is now in serious efforts to end the gang of Hari, but Hari on the other hand, is getting stronger day by day. Shekhar gets a job at a Marwari business group and ditches Mani's sister. She, who is pregnant by then, commits suicide. Mani, shocked by this incident, is unaware of Shekhar's involvement with his sister and indirect cause of her suicide. Hari decides to marry Kiran and with the help of his friends plan to start up a new life outside Mumbai. Amar Bakhia orchestrates attacks on Hari and his gang, leaving many of Hari's friends dead. Hari plots revenge and executes those responsible including Amar, and prepares to escape with Kiran.

Meanwhile, Mani gets a letter written by his sister to Hari, which he misunderstands as it's Hari who is responsible for his sister's death. Mani informs the police about Hari's plan to leave Mumbai. While parting, Hari informs Mani about Shekhar and expresses regret for not being able to save her. On realizing the truth, Mani reveals the ambush plans and asks Hari to escape before police reaches the spot. But it is too late by then, as police surround him and shoot him down.

Cast
 Mohanlal as Harikrishnan / Hari Anna
 Shankar as Shekhar
 Geetha as Kiran
 Cochin Haneefa as Chotta Shankar
 Jagadish as Manikandan/Mani
 Mahesh Anand as Amar Bakhia
 Rami Reddy as Abbas Ali
 Poornam Viswanathan as Mudaliar
 K. B. Ganesh Kumar as Gopalakrishnan
 Sukumari as Kalyani, Mani's and Radha's mother
 Nandhu
 Manjula Vijayakumar as Madam of the brothel
 Suchitra Murali as Radha, Mani's younger sister

Box office
The film collected a gross of ₹83 lakhs from 25 centres when it completed 25 days run, as per Mathrubhumi daily, which was a record at that time and finally the film declared as a hit at box office .

Music
The film score was composed by Johnson while the original songs featured in the film were by composed by Raveendran and lyrics penned by Kaithapram Damodaran Namboothiri. This consisted of 5 songs:

Awards
Kerala State Film Awards
 Best Actor - Mohanlal
 Best Editor - N. Gopalakrishnan
 Best Sound Editor - Deepan Chetterji

References

External links

1990s Malayalam-language films
1991 films
Films with screenplays by T. Damodaran
Indian gangster films
Films directed by Priyadarshan
Films about organised crime in India
Fictional portrayals of the Maharashtra Police
Films shot in Mumbai
Films scored by Raveendran
Malayalam films remade in other languages